Dong Zhisen (born 24 June 1960) is a journalist from Jincheng, Kinmen, Republic of China. Dong used to work as a reporter for China Times and United Daily News. He covered mainly Taipei Municipal news. He was the former presenter of the TVBS political talk show《2100全民開講. He has a  Hokkien accent when speaking in Mandarin.

Professional background 
Starting as a reporter, Dong has covered news mainly about Taipei. He then shifted to political commentary. On March 12, 2013, when 李濤 announced a temporary withdrawal 《2100全民開講》, Dong took over.

Midday show on UFO Radio《飛碟電臺》《飛碟午餐:董智森時間》
He is the current host of the UFO Radio's(飛碟電台) midday show.

See also
Taipei City Government

References

External links
2100全民開講
飛碟電台

1960 births
Living people
Taiwanese journalists
Tamkang University alumni
People from Kinmen County